The Pearl Jam 2005 North American/Latin American Tour was a concert tour by the American rock band Pearl Jam.

History
After taking a break from recording its eighth studio album, the band embarked on a Canadian cross-country tour in September 2005, kicking off the tour with a fundraising concert on August 29, 2005 in Missoula, Montana at the University of Montana-Missoula's Adams Event Center for Democratic politician Jon Tester, then playing The Gorge Amphitheatre in George, Washington on September 1, 2005 before crossing into Canada. For its Canadian cross-country tour, the band stopped in cities where it had never played before such as Saskatoon, Quebec City, St. John's, and Halifax. Pearl Jam's performance of "Given to Fly" from Saskatoon was shown on the ReAct Now: Music & Relief benefit concert. After touring Canada, Pearl Jam proceeded to open a Rolling Stones concert on the band's A Bigger Bang Tour on September 28, 2005 in Pittsburgh at PNC Park, then played two shows at the Borgata casino in Atlantic City, New Jersey, before closing the tour with a concert on October 3, 2005 in Philadelphia at the Wachovia Center. The song "Gone" from Pearl Jam's 2006 self-titled album was debuted in a solo performance by vocalist Eddie Vedder at Pearl Jam's October 1, 2005 concert in Atlantic City, New Jersey. Pearl Jam also played a benefit concert to raise money for Hurricane Katrina relief. The concert, which took place October 5, 2005, at the House of Blues in Chicago, also featured Robert Plant of Led Zeppelin fame. The concert proceeds were donated to Habitat for Humanity, the American Red Cross and the Jazz Foundation of America.

On November 22, 2005, Pearl Jam began its first Latin American tour. The tour included two shows in Santiago, Chile at Estadio San Carlos de Apoquindo, two in Buenos Aires, Argentina at Ferrocarril Oeste Stadium, and five in Brazil (Porto Alegre at Gigantinho Gymnasium, Curitiba, two shows in São Paulo at Pacaembu, and Rio de Janeiro at Apoteose). The band finished off 2005 with three shows in Mexico (Monterrey at Auditorio Coca-Cola and two shows in Mexico City at Palacio de los Deportes). Mudhoney, one of the few other remaining bands of the Seattle grunge era, opened for Pearl Jam throughout this tour. During the tour, Vedder emphasized how much he missed Johnny Ramone, his friend and guitarist of the Ramones who died in 2004. As a tribute to Johnny, the band played the Ramones' song "I Believe In Miracles" at every show on the tour, including a performance with Marky Ramone behind the drum kit at the Porto Alegre show.

The official bootlegs for the band's 2005 shows were distributed via Pearl Jam's official website in MP3 form. The music downloads were accompanied by pictures from individual shows. The band's show at The Gorge Amphitheatre was released as part of the Live at the Gorge 05/06 box set.

Tour dates

Band members
Pearl Jam
Jeff Ament – bass guitar
Stone Gossard – rhythm guitar
Mike McCready – lead guitar
Eddie Vedder – lead vocals, guitar
Matt Cameron – drums

Additional musicians
Boom Gaspar – Hammond B3 and keyboards

Songs performed

Originals

"1/2 Full"
"Alive"
"Alone"
"Animal"
"Around the Bend"
"Bee Girl"
"Better Man"
"Black"
"Black, Red, Yellow"
"Blood"
"Brain of J."
"Breakerfall"
"Breath"
"Bu$hleaguer"
"Can't Keep"
"Corduroy"
"Cropduster"
"Daughter"
"Dead Man"
"Dissident"
"Do the Evolution"
"Don't Gimme No Lip"
"Down"
"Drifting"
"Elderly Woman Behind the Counter in a Small Town"
"Even Flow"
"Faithfull"
"Footsteps"
"Given to Fly"
"Glorified G"
"Go"
"Gone"
"Green Disease"
"Grievance"
"Habit"
"Hail, Hail"
"Hard to Imagine"
"I Am Mine"
"I Got Id"
"Immortality"
"In Hiding"
"In My Tree"
"Indifference"
"Insignificance"
"Jeremy"
"Last Exit"
"Leatherman"
"Light Years"
"Long Road"
"Love Boat Captain"
"Low Light"
"Lukin"
"Man of the Hour"
"MFC"
"Not for You"
"Nothing as It Seems"
"Nothingman"
"Oceans"
"Off He Goes"
"Once"
"Porch"
"Present Tense"
"Rearviewmirror"
"Red Mosquito"
"Release"
"Sad"
"Save You"
"Sleight of Hand"
"Smile"
"Sometimes"
"Soon Forget"
"Spin the Black Circle"
"State of Love and Trust"
"Thumbing My Way"
"U"
"Undone"
"Untitled"
"W.M.A." (snippet)
"Wash"
"Whipping"
"Wishlist"
"Yellow Ledbetter"
"You Are"

Covers
"American in Me" (Avengers)
"Androgynous Mind" (Sonic Youth) (snippet)
"Another Brick in the Wall" (Pink Floyd) (snippet)
"Atlantic City" (Bruce Springsteen)
"Atomic Dog" (George Clinton) (snippet)
"Baba O'Riley" (The Who)
"Bad" (U2) (snippet)
"Bleed for Me" (Dead Kennedys)
"Blitzkrieg Bop" (Ramones) (snippet)
"Cowboy Song" (Thin Lizzy)
"Crazy Mary" (Victoria Williams)
"Crown of Thorns" (Mother Love Bone)
"Don't Be Shy" (Cat Stevens)
"Dream Baby Dream" (Suicide) (snippet)
"Driven to Tears" (The Police)
"Eleanor Rigby" (The Beatles) (snippet)
"Fool in the Rain" (Led Zeppelin)
"Fortunate Son" (Creedence Clearwater Revival)
"Fuckin' Up" (Neil Young)
"Gimme Some Truth" (John Lennon)
"Going to California" (Led Zeppelin)
"Growin' Up" (Bruce Springsteen)
"Hard Times Are Over" (Yoko Ono) (snippet)
"Harvest Moon" (Neil Young)
"I Believe in Miracles" (Ramones)
"I Wanna Be Your Boyfriend" (Ramones) (snippet)
"I Won't Back Down" (Tom Petty)
"Interstellar Overdrive" (Pink Floyd) (snippet)
"It's OK" (Dead Moon) (snippet)
"Kick Out the Jams" (MC5)
"Last Kiss" (Wayne Cochran)
"Leaving Here" (Edward Holland, Jr.)
"Little Sister" (Elvis Presley)
"Modern Girl" (Sleater-Kinney) (snippet)
"Money (That's What I Want)" (Barrett Strong)
"Mother" (Danzig)
"No Surrender" (Bruce Springsteen)
"Poor Girl" (X)
"The Promised Land" (Bruce Springsteen)
"Rockin' in the Free World" (Neil Young)
"Ruby Tuesday" (The Rolling Stones) (snippet)
"Runnin' Back to Saskatoon" (The Guess Who)
"Save It for Later" (The Beat) (snippet)
"Sonic Reducer" (The Dead Boys)
"Suck You Dry" (Mudhoney) (snippet)
"Thank You" (Led Zeppelin)
"Throw Your Arms Around Me" (Hunters & Collectors)
"Trouble" (Cat Stevens)
"Wild Horses" (The Rolling Stones)
"Yahweh" (U2) (snippet)
"You've Got to Hide Your Love Away" (The Beatles)

Gallery

References

2005 concert tours
Pearl Jam concert tours